Dobson Ranch is a planned community in Mesa, Arizona. It was built between 1973 and 1999 on and around the site of a homestead that was purchased from the Dobson family by the City of Mesa. The community, which is characterized by a golf course and several small man-made lakes, is bordered by the US 60 to the north, the 101 to the west, Guadalupe Road to the south, and Extension Road to the east.

References

External links
 Dobson Ranch homeowner's association
 Dobson Ranch Residents Google Group
 More Dobson Ranch neighborhood information

Dobson Ranch
Neighborhoods in Arizona